"I Don't Think About You" is a song by American singer Kelly Clarkson, from her eighth studio album, Meaning of Life (2017). It was written and produced by the production duo The Monarch, with co-writing by American singer Harlœ and pianist Michael Pollack. The song was issued by Atlantic Records as the album's second single on February 9, 2018.

Composition 
"I Don't Think About You" is written by Sean & Andre Davidson of the production duo The Monarch, singer Jessica Ashley (professionally known as Harlœ), and Vanderbilt pianist Michael Pollack. Lyrically, the song is about emerging from a failed relationship, and was primarily based on Harlœ's past. Harlœ, who travelled to Nashville, Tennessee in 2016 to collaborate with Clarkson, told her that the song was inspired by a situation in her life where she was old enough to finally realize and conclude that the relationship 'didn't work out, and you're kind of a douche, but thank you for making me a stronger human. Let's just move on. I wish you well, but I wish you not near me.'" Prior to finishing the track, Clarkson had asked Harlœ to pen it like a Whitney-esque ballad to showcase her range, which led to an arrangement emphasizing on her vocals. Music critics also observed that the song's content may also haven alluded to Clarkson's relationship to her former label, RCA Records as wells as her detractors.

"I Don't Think About You" features a piano-backed melody performed by Pollack and a key-change towards the end of the song. It also features string arrangements conducted by Paul Buckmaster, and is one of his final studio recordings prior to his death. The song is written in the key of A♭ major with a moderately slow tempo, Clarkson's voice spans two octaves from C4 to C6.

Critical reception 
Glenn Gamboa of Newsday complimentary compared the song to Mariah Carey's debut material and that she showcases her multi-octave range and walks the line between vulnerability and defiance in a way that is as timeless as Carey's debut. Idolator's Mike Nied wrote that the ballad lets her voice soar through some intricate gymnastics on what could be one of her most challenging arrangements, and remarked that "Unsurprisingly, she misses no steps and delivers something truly commendable for both the vocal excellence and personal growth she displays." Ariana Davis of Refinery29 noted that the glass-shattering soprano notes and passion behind each lyric of the song seem to be sending the listener a very clear message: that she is, indeed, proud of the woman she has become.

Live performances
To promote "I Don't Think About You", Clarkson has performed the song live on several television shows. On February 26, 2018, Clarkson performed the song live on Today. On February 28, she performed the song on Late Night with Seth Meyers. She performed it on The Ellen DeGeneres Show on April 26, and on the fourteenth season of The Voice on May 7, 2018.

Music video 
The accompanying music video premiered on Clarkson's official YouTube on March 20, 2018. In a press release, Clarkson describes the song as "the moment you realize something has no power over you anymore... We all have people and/or situations in life that mold us and sometimes those situations can feel like they're about the break us, but this song is about that morning you wake up and you don't even think about it anymore. It holds no power, no weight in your world, and consumes your thoughts no longer. It's a song about freedom, honestly."

In the video, Clarkson is singing on a platform and there are scenes interspersed of younger versions of Clarkson, as Billboards Abby Jones describes as, "including a rocky family situation during her childhood, a troubling boyfriend in her teen years and battling management as she entered the early stages of her career."

Track listing 
Digital streaming

Digital streaming – Remixes EP

Personnel 
Credits from Tidal.

 Lead vocals – Kelly Clarkson
 Background vocals – Nicole Hurst, Bridget Sarai
 Songwriters – Andre Davidson, Sean Davidson, Jessica Ashley Karpov, Michael Pollack
 Producers – The Monarch,
 Additional producer – Michael Pollack
 Mixing engineer – John Hanes
 Mastering engineers – Chris Gehringer, Will Quinnell
 Engineers – Todd Tidwell, Steve Churchyard
 Cello	– Jacob Braun, Erika Duke, Armen Ksajikian, Tim Landauer. Victor Lawrence, Dane Little

 Conductor and string arranger – Paul Buckmaster
 Contractor – Suzie Katayama
 Drums and drum programmers – Andre Davidson, Sean Davidson
 Mixer	– Serban Ghenea
 Piano – Michael Pollack
 Programmers – Andre Davidson, Sean Davidson
 Viola	– Zach Dellinger, Andrew Duckles, Darrin McCann, David Walther
 Violin – Charlie Bisharat, Mario De Leon, Joel Derouin, Bruce Dukov, Neel Hammond, Gerry Hilera, Songa Lee, Natalie Leggett, Serena McKinney, Lucia Micarelli, Sara Parkins, Michele Richards, Tereza Stanislav, John Wittenberg

Charts

Weekly charts

Year-end charts

Release history

References 

2010s ballads
2017 songs
2018 singles
Atlantic Records singles
Kelly Clarkson songs
Songs with feminist themes
Songs written by Michael Pollack (musician)
Songs written by Jessica Ashley
Songs written by Andre Davidson
Songs written by Sean Davidson
Song recordings produced by the Monarch (production team)